Triassic Attack is a 2010 television film directed by Colin Ferguson and produced by UFO International Productions. It premiered November 27, 2010, on the Syfy television channel.

Synopsis
Triassic Attack is set in Mill City, United States, where a large university has bought a significant amount of local land and property with the intent to expand its grounds by demolishing half the houses and shops. A local Native American named Dakota is opposed to the plans, which will destroy his ancestors' heritage. He also feels his people were tricked into signing away their land, and is trying to stop the bulldozers moving in. Dakota's nephew is Jake Roundtree, the town sheriff, who has to abide by the law. Frustrated and angry, Dakota decides to use ancient magic to save the town and performs a rite which causes evil spirits to possess three dinosaur skeletons, bringing them to life. The rampaging skeletons attack and kill everyone they meet. Jake and his ex-wife Emma set out together to find and save their daughter Savannah and try to stop the dinosaurs. Dakota joins them and together they manage to electrocute the fossils with a local power plant, setting an end to their rampage.

Cast
 Steven Brand as Sheriff Jake Roundtree
 Kirsty Mitchell as Emma Neil-Roundtree
 Emilia Clarke as Savannah Roundtree
 Raoul Trujillo as Dakota
 Gabriel Womack as Wyatt
 Christopher Villiers as Professor Keller

References

External links
 

Syfy original films
2010 television films
2010 films
Films about dinosaurs
Colin Ferguson
Films scored by Frederik Wiedmann
Films shot in Bulgaria
Films set in the United States
2010s English-language films
2010s American films